Dichomeris pyrrhoschista is a moth in the family Gelechiidae. It was described by Edward Meyrick in 1934. It is found in Taiwan and Sichuan, China.

The forewings are light orange with reddish-orange streaks along the veins. The hindwings are dark grey.

References

Moths described in 1934
pyrrhoschista